Carlos Emilio Lampe Porras (born March 17, 1987) is a Bolivian footballer who plays as a goalkeeper for Bolívar and the Bolivia national team.

Club career 
During the 2010 season he was the first choice keeper for Universitario de Sucre, having played all six games in their journey through the 2010 version of the Copa Nissan Sudamericana, picking up the MVP award in a couple of matches. Lampe has also become a regular choice keeper for the Bolivian squad.

After a number of years abroad with Huachipato (Chile) and a brief stint with Boca Juniors (Argentina), in 2020 Lampe returned to Bolivian club football with Always Ready, winning the 2020 División de Fútbol Profesional, the first title in the club's history.

International career
Lampe has been a Bolivian international since 2010, earning 49 caps. He has represented his country in FIFA World Cup qualification matches.

Lampe played for Bolivia in the 2007 U-20 South American Championship held in Paraguay. In 2009, he received his first call up to the senior national team for the 2010 World Cup qualifiers against Venezuela and Chile on June 6 and 10 respectively. However, the manager decided to bench him on both games. He made his full international debut for Bolivia on February 24, 2010 in a friendly against Mexico.

References

External links
 
 
 
 

1987 births
Living people
Sportspeople from Santa Cruz de la Sierra
Bolivian people of German descent
Association football goalkeepers
Bolivian footballers
Bolivian expatriate footballers
Bolivia international footballers
Universitario de Sucre footballers
Club Bolívar players
Guabirá players
Club San José players
C.D. Huachipato footballers
Boca Juniors footballers
Club Always Ready players
Club Atlético Vélez Sarsfield footballers
Atlético Tucumán footballers
Bolivian Primera División players
Chilean Primera División players
Argentine Primera División players
2019 Copa América players
2021 Copa América players
Bolivian expatriate sportspeople in Chile
Bolivian expatriate sportspeople in Argentina
Expatriate footballers in Chile
Expatriate footballers in Argentina